Crook is a civil parish in the South Lakeland District of Cumbria, England. It contains 19 listed buildings that are recorded in the National Heritage List for England.  All the listed buildings are designated at Grade II, the lowest of the three grades, which is applied to "buildings of national importance and special interest".  The parish is in the Lake District National Park to the east of the southern part of Windermere.  It contains the villages of Crook and Winster, and is otherwise rural.  Most of the listed buildings are houses with associated structures, farmhouses, and farm buildings.  The other listed buildings are the tower of a disused church, a packhorse bridge, a public house, and a school.


Buildings

References

Citations

Sources

Lists of listed buildings in Cumbria